Service numbers were used by the United States Department of Defense as the primary means of service member identification from 1918 until 1974 (and before 1947 by the U.S. Army and U.S. Navy). Service numbers are public information available under the Freedom of Information Act, unlike social security numbers which are protected by the Privacy Act of 1974.

Usage

Each branch of the military service had its own version of service numbers. In order by year of creation, these were:

 United States Army service numbers (1918)
 United States Navy service numbers (1920)
 United States Marine Corps service numbers (1920)
 United States Coast Guard service numbers (1921)
 United States Air Force service numbers (1948)

The following are the original service numbers which were first issued to United States military personnel:

 R-1: Arthur Crean – First service number of the United States armed forces
 O-1: John J. Pershing – First officer service number of the United States Army
 100 00 01: Clayton Aab — First enlisted service number of the United States Navy
 532 – Samuel R. Colhoun — Earliest recorded officer service number of the United States Navy
 01 – James Ackerman – First officer service number of the United States Marine Corps
 20001 – Alexander Schott — First enlisted service number of the United States Marine Corps
 1000 – Joseph F. Farley – First officer service number of the United States Coast Guard
 100000 – Mason B. Herring — First enlisted service number of the United States Coast Guard
 4A: Hoyt Vandenberg – Earliest recorded officer service number of the United States Air Force

The original Air Force enlisted force was composed of personnel formerly of the United States Army Air Forces who continued to use their Army service numbers upon transfer to the Air Force in 1947. Thus, there is no established "first" enlisted service number of the U.S. Air Force since thousands of airmen simultaneously transferred into the Air Force on 18 September 1947.

Service numbers were eventually phased out completely by the social security number; the Army and Air Force converted to social security numbers on 1 July 1969, the Navy and Marine Corps on 1 January 1972, and the Coast Guard on 1 October 1974. Since that time, social security numbers have become the de facto military service number for United States armed forces personnel.

Beginning in 2002, the military began a further effort to protect the use of social security numbers, even within the military itself. New regulations declared that on all but the most official of documents (such as a DD Form 214 or evaluation reports) social security numbers would only list the last four digits. Regulations also were enacted to redact the social security number of reporting seniors (which were written in their entirety) on the personal copies of evaluation reports given to service members. The reason for this was to prevent possible identity theft issues committed by service members who had received a bad evaluation or who were disgruntled with their commanding officer.

Format

The general design of United States service numbers was created first by the United States Army and later adapted by the other branches of the armed forces. Between each branch, service numbers are assigned differently while some branches make a conscious effort to separate officer and enlisted numbers while others do not. It is therefore common in the U.S. service number system for officers and enlisted personnel to perhaps hold the same service number and even more common for service members from different branches to be assigned the same number as well.

The Army is the only branch of service to begin both officer and enlisted service numbers at No. 1. Marine Corps officer numbers also begin at No. 1 but Marine Corps enlisted numbers start much later at #20,001. There is also no service No. 1 in the Navy, Coast Guard, or Air Force although the earliest recorded Air Force officer number was No. 4.

The entire range of United States service numbers extends from 1 to 99,999,999 with the United States Army and Air Force the only services to use numbers higher than ten million. A special range of numbers from one to seven thousand (1–7000) was also used by the United States Air Force Academy for assignment only to cadets and was not considered part of the regular service number system. Another unique service number series was the National Guard which used service numbers solely in the range of twenty to twenty nine million (20,000,000 – 29,999,999).

Prefix and suffix codes

Service number prefix and suffix codes were one and two letter designators written before or after a service number; a service member could only have one code at any given time. The purpose of these codes was to provide additional information regarding a military service member with the very first prefix codes created by the Army in 1920 and greatly expanded over the next thirty years. The Navy created the first suffix code "W", written after the service numbers of female enlisted personnel, but it was the Air Force that made the greatest use of suffix codes until 1965 when the Air Force switched to using prefixes. Some prefix and suffix codes were also re-introduced, with different meanings, by various branches of military. In the modern age, the only code that survives is the suffix code "FR", written after the social security numbers of Regular Air Force personnel.

References
Sources
 National Personnel Records Center, Instruction Memo 1865.20E, "Service Number Information", 14 April 1988
 Military Personnel Records Center, "Training Guide Concerning Military Service Numbers", 28 June 2009

Notes

Military of the United States
Military life
Identifiers